The 1972 Fidelity WCT Tournament, also known as the Richmond WCT, was a men's professional tennis tournament that was part of the Group A of the 1972 World Championship Tennis circuit. It was held on indoor carpet courts at the Richmond Coliseum in Richmond, Virginia in the United States. It was the seventh edition of the tournament and was held from February 2 through February 6, 1972. First-seeded Rod Laver won the singles title and earned $10,000 first-prize money.

Finals

Singles

 Rod Laver defeated  Cliff Drysdale 2–6, 6–3, 7–5, 6–3
 It was Laver's 1st singles title of the year and the 51st of his career in the Open Era.

Doubles

 Tom Okker /  Marty Riessen defeated  John Newcombe /  Tony Roche 7–6, 7–6

References

External links
 ITF tournament edition details

Fidelity WCT Tournament
Fidelity WCT Tournament
Fidelity WCT Tournament
Fidelity WCT Tournament
Tennis in Virginia